Larry Foster Skinner (born April 21, 1956 in Vancouver, British Columbia) is a retired National Hockey League player. He played 47 games for the Colorado Rockies and spent most of his professional career in the American Hockey League with stints in the Central Hockey League and in Europe in the Austrian and French leagues. On August 11, 2010, he was named an assistant coach of the Ottawa 67s of the Ontario Hockey League after performing a similar role with the Nepean Raiders of the Central Junior Hockey League.

Skinner scored the first goal in Colorado Rockies history on October 5, 1976.

Career statistics

Regular season and playoffs

External links
 

1956 births
Living people
Canadian ice hockey centres
Colorado Rockies (NHL) players
Fort Worth Texans players
Français Volants players
Hampton Gulls (AHL) players
Hershey Bears players
Houston Aeros draft picks
Innsbrucker EV players
Kansas City Scouts draft picks
Nepean Raiders players
New Haven Nighthawks players
Ottawa 67's players
Philadelphia Firebirds (AHL) players
Phoenix Roadrunners (CHL) players
Rhode Island Reds players
Ice hockey people from Vancouver
Springfield Indians players
Winnipeg Clubs players